The Atlanta Machine Works was early Atlanta's first foundry and metal fabrication company. in 1848, Austin Leyden together with Robert Findlay and others established a foundry, amassed a fortune and eventually sold the company, called A. Leyden & Co., in 1853 to a business partner. Thereafter it became known as the Atlanta Machine Works and went on to play a central role in the Civil War, producing weaponry and other goods for the Confederacy. The foundry was located at the northwest corner of Hunter (now Martin Luther King, Jr. Blvd.) and King streets, now occupied by a larger industrial site only  from the Georgia State Capitol.

Between August and December, 1863, the firm delivered 2323 rounds of shot and shell to the Confederate Atlanta Arsenal.   At that time the plant employed seventeen men of military age.  One source states that cannon were produced here and rifled at the roundhouse of the Western & Atlantic Railroad.

The name of the company owning the Works changed several times; one name was Porter & Davis.

By the turn of the 20th century, the Atlanta Machine Works was producing agricultural and mining equipment as well as mills.

References

External links
Envelope imprinted with logo of Atlanta Machine Works

Demolished buildings and structures in Atlanta
Industrial landmarks in Atlanta
Ironworks and steel mills in the United States